Delaney Davidson (born 15 December 1972) is a New Zealand singer-songwriter from Lyttelton, New Zealand. He is also known for his musical production and guitar work, being a multi instrumentalist. His work extends into graphics, visual art, theatre and film. Davidson mainly performs solo with his Ghost Orchestra, but has often played and recorded with different projects. Davidson's musical style while incorporating elements of folk, noise, rock and country is firmly rooted in the blues.

Early life and family
Born in Auckland, Davidson is the son of John William Davidson and Glyn Ellen Abbott. He grew up in Christchurch, was educated at the Christchurch Rudolf Steiner School and played in several punk and blues bands, before being expelled from school and moving to Melbourne.

1993–1999: Early years
Early musical connections for Davidson were in Melbourne when he began working with Stu Thomas, Nique Needles, in Doghouse, and Brass Bed. He also got a taste for macabre performance with Ewan Cameron in Theatre of Hell, and took part in Premeditated Depredation, a freak performance art piece.  After six years in Melbourne, he started to turn his attention to country music and solo performance.

2000–2003: Dead Brothers
Moving to Switzerland in 2000, Davidson met the Voodoo Rhythm Records Family, run by Reverend Beatman, and joined the Dead Brothers. He toured with them for three years, recording WunderKammer and Flammend Herz, the soundtrack to the Tattoo Film of the same name.

2003–2009: Ghost Orchestra
Davidson also began to develop his solo show into the Ghost Orchestra, which he toured Europe and US with from 2005 until today.

In 2009 Davidson toured the US with Holly Golightly, and as a duo with Reverend Beatman.

2009–2011: Between Europe and New Zealand
Straddling the globe, he continued to work in Europe and began to reconnect with his roots in New Zealand, becoming instrumental in the Lyttelton folk scene and recognised as a seminal influence on artists like Marlon Williams, Tami Neilson, Aldous Harding, The Eastern and Nadia Reid.

2011–2014: Production

2011 saw his album production work extend beyond his solo albums into his three collaboration albums with Marlon Williams, and led to him producing Tami Neilson’s breakthrough album Dynamite!, and follow-up release Don't Be Afraid. His production work continues to grow with some of New Zealand’s long term established artists: Barry Saunders, Harry Lyon and Jordan Luck.

He also has worked live with Bruce Russell of The Dead C, Neil Finn, and toured New Zealand with Garth Hudson.

2014–2017: Co-writing
Davidson has worked extensively with co-writing attending 
Pat Macdonald's Steel Bridge Songfest, and has co-written with Kim Richey, Tami Neilson, Reverend Beatman, Eric McFadden, Marlon Williams, Troy Kingi, and Nathaniel Rateliff.

Awards and career highlights
In 2010, Davidson won the Sad Song Competition in Berlin and was declared champion of the One Man Band competition in Zurich the following year.
No Depression described the sound of Davidson's 2010 album Decapitation as "altogether dirty, lonesome, restless and wildly engrossing."

Anthony Healey, Australasian Performing Right Association's (APRA) Director of NZ Operations, said of the song 'You're a Loser" from Davidson's album Bad Luck Man: "There is an honesty and integrity to all Delaney's songs and is evidenced in spades in 'You're a Loser'. This song is anything but a loser and we are immensely proud of the reputation Delaney has achieved both internationally and at home." The song won Best Song at the New Zealand Country Music Awards.

Davidson's 2011 album Bad Luck Man featured the track 'Little Heart', which threw him into the spotlight as a finalist in the 2011 APRA Silver Scroll Awards. Although he didn't win, he was thought of as the people's favourite.

In 2013, Davidson collaborated with fellow New Zealand musician Marlon Williams (of the Unfaithful Ways) for the album Sad But True – The Secret History of Country Music Songwriting Volume 1. It was received positive reviews in mainstream publications, with The New Zealand Herald dubbing the collaboration "seamless" and a "heady concoction of truth-seeking". It was also praised for seamlessly harmonising the young "clean" voice of Williams with the "darker" vocals of Davidson. The album later won Davidson and Williams won the New Zealand Music Awards' Country Music Album of the Year. RIANZ managing director, Chris Caddick, congratulated Davidson and Williams on their win. "Well done to Delaney and Marlon on their richly deserved Tui for the album Sad But True. Their take on a classic American art form is brilliantly executed and a real joy to listen to."

Davidson followed up the first volume of Sad But True with two more instalments, the second self-released on The Grand Ole Hayride tour. The third volume, Juke-Box B-Sides, reached number 12 on the New Zealand Albums Chart in February 2014.

Davidson was also the winner of the APRA New Zealand Country Music Song of the Year three years in a row.

In 2014, he co-wrote 'Whiskey & Kisses' with Tami Neilson. It was later released on Neilson's album Dynamite!, which Davidson also produced. Davidson made his second appearance on the New Zealand Albums Chart in September 2015, with his album Lucky Guy peaking at number 24.

Davidson's songs are prominently featured in season one of The Brokenwood Mysteries TV series.

In 2015, Davidson received the New Zealand Arts Foundation Laureate award.

Film and television appearances
 The Road to Nod – Slowboat Films 
 Voodoo Rhythm Documentary 
 The Dead Brothers Documentary 
 Delaney Davidson on the Gravy 
 Reverend Beatman and Delaney Davidson Cheese On Toast 
 New Sound of Country Music Documentary 
 Devil In The Parlour Documentary

Other projects
 Melbourne 1993 to 1996, ART exhibitions: Nocturnal Paintings and Prints.
 Theatre music for the Basel Stadt Theatre, Drei Groschen Oper.
 Executive producer for the Voodoo Rhythm 5 Short Films project between NZ filmmaker Damien Shatford and Swiss label Voodoo Rhythm.
 Produced Christchurch Arts Festival smash hit "Totally Weill", a selection of Kurt Weill's music (https://web.archive.org/web/20131002091529/http://www.artsfestival.co.nz/totallyweill)

Discography
With the Dead Brothers:
2004: Flammend Herz (Voodoo Rhythm Records)
2006: WunderKammer (Voodoo Rhythm Records)

Delaney Davidson:
2007: Rough Diamond (Stink Magnetic)
2008: Ghost Songs (Casbah Records)
2010: Self Decapitation (Voodoo Rhythm)
2011: The Harbour Union, featuring Davidson, The Eastern, Lindon Puffin, Al Park, The Unfaithful Ways, Tiny Lies and Runaround Sue
2011: Bad Luck Man (Voodoo Rhythm)
2012: Sad But True – The Secret History of Country Music Songwriting Volume 1 (with Marlon Williams) (Lyttelton Records)
2013: Sad But True Volume Two (As "The Grand Ole Hayride" with Tami Neilson, Marlon Williams and Dave Khan) (Self-released)
2014: Sad But True Volume 3 – Juke-Box B-Sides (with Marlon Williams) (Lyttelton Records)
2014: Swim Down Low (Outside Inside Records)
2015: Diamond Dozen (Squoodge Records)
2015: Lucky Guy (Southbound Music)
2016: Devil In The Parlour: 6 Live Tracks (Rough Diamond Inc)
2018: Shining Day (Glass Redux)

Produced:
2014: Produced Dynamite! for Tami Neilson
2015: Produced Don't Be Afraid for Tami Neilson
2020: Co-produced Chickaboom! with Tami Neilson
2021: Co-produced Black Sea Golden Ladder with Troy Kingi

Press quotes
 "Another brilliant collection from one of New Zealand's best." – Lydia Jenkin, The New Zealand Herald, 29 May 2014 (review for Swim Down Low)
 “Whiskey and Kisses is an adult Willie'n'Emmylou tear-stained barroom dialogue which would enhance the career of any Nashville or Austin singer and songwriter. It's extraordinary." – Graham Reid, The New Zealand Herald, 27 March 2014
 “The relish on Davidson's lips, however, suggests the Devil ought to be the one running scared" (4 stars) – Q (UK), August 2012)
 "Delaney Davidson – one of our country's best and hardest to define songwriters." – Ricardo Kerr, GrooveGuide, 8 November 2012
 "I think he is amazing." – Ray Columbus, March 2012
 "... a haunting power" – Nick Bollinger, New Zealand Listener, 17 November 2012
 "Wonderful" – Blues & Soul (UK; review of Bad Luck Man)
 "Sublime...raw and original" – Blues & Soul (UK; review of EP)
 "Like it was recorded in some revival tent in full flow" – The Beat (UK)
 "A rattling, twanging celebration" (5 stars) – The Independent (UK)

References

External links
Delaney Davidson web site
Lyttelton Records
Voodoo Rhythm
Outside Inside Records

Videos
"Big Ugly Fish" – from the album Swim Down Low
"Candyman" from the album Sad But True Volume 3
"Bloodletter" – from the album Sad But True Volume 1
"How Lucky You Are" – from the album Sad But True Volume 1
"Little Heart" – from the album Self Decapitation

1972 births
APRA Award winners
Living people
New Zealand male singer-songwriters
New Zealand male guitarists
People from Lyttelton, New Zealand
21st-century New Zealand male singers
21st-century guitarists